The Bridlington Principles are a set of rules aimed at resolving conflicts among trade unions. First drafted in 1939, they initially required that unions did not attempt to "poach" each other's members, in the interests of a cohesive, non-conflictual atmosphere of industrial relations.

In TU branch meetings, membership applications from members of other unions are often "accepted subject to Bridlington".

In September 2007, the Trade Union Congress agreed to changes to Principle 3 recommended by the TUC Executive Committee in the Annual Report to Congress. References to situations where a union is currently engaged in organising activity have now been added. This booklet supersedes the previous publication that incorporated the changes agreed by the TUC General Council in May 2000, which took into account the then new statutory recognition scheme.

The four principles cover:
 Co-operation and the prevention of disputes
 Membership
 Organisation and recognition
 Inter-union disputes and industrial action

See also

UK labour law

References

United Kingdom labour law
1939 in the United Kingdom
1939 in labor relations